Petra Nicolaisen (born 12 December 1965) is a German politician of the Christian Democratic Union (CDU) who has been serving as a member of the Bundestag from the state of Schleswig-Holstein since 2017.

Political career 
From 2009 until 2017, Nicolaisen was a member of the State Parliament of Schleswig-Holstein for three terms, where she served on the Committee on Internal and Legal Affairs. She also served on the Committee on the Environment and Agriculture and the Committee on Petitions from 2009 until 2012.

Nicolaisen became a member of the Bundestag in the 2017 German federal election, representing the Flensburg – Schleswig constituency. She lost the constituency to Green Party co-leader Robert Habeck in 2021, but was nevertheless re-elected to the Bundestag through the CDU state party list in Schleswig-Holstein. She is a member of the Committee on Internal Affairs.

In addition to her committee assignments, Nicolaisen co-chairs the German-Nordic Parliamentary Friendship Group and is a member of the German delegation to the Baltic Sea Parliamentary Conference (BSPC).

References

External links 

  
 Bundestag biography 

1965 births
Living people
Members of the Bundestag for Schleswig-Holstein
Female members of the Bundestag
21st-century German women politicians
Members of the Bundestag 2021–2025
Members of the Bundestag 2017–2021
Members of the Bundestag for the Christian Democratic Union of Germany